St Paul's Cathedral, Kako is a cathedral of the Church of Uganda (Anglican ) in Masaka,  Central Region of Uganda. It is the seat of the Diocese of West Buganda, which was erected in 1960.

References

Anglican cathedrals in Uganda